Labarthe-Inard is a former railway station in Labarthe-Inard, Occitanie, France. The station is on the Toulouse–Bayonne railway line. The station was served by TER (local) services operated by the SNCF.

References

Railway stations in France opened in 1862
Defunct railway stations in Haute-Garonne